Patrik Rogoň (born 16 November 1996) is a Slovak professional ice hockey player currently playing for HC Košice of the Slovak Extraliga.

Career
Rogoň began his career with MsHK Žilina's academy and made his senior debut for the team during the 2014–15 season, when he played one game in relegation series against HC 07 Detva.

Career statistics

Regular season and playoffs

References

External links
 

1996 births
Living people
Slovak ice hockey right wingers
MsHK Žilina players
HC Nové Zámky players
HC Košice players
Sportspeople from Žilina